Siege of Mons may refer to:
 Siege of Mons (1572), during the Eighty Years' War
 Siege of Mons (1691), during the Nine Years' War
 Siege of Mons (1709), during the War of the Spanish Succession